The 1916 Nevada Sagebrushers football team was an American football team that represented the University of Nevada as an independent during the 1916 college football season. The Sagebrushers were led by second-year head coach Jack Glascock and played their home games at Mackay Field.

Schedule

References

Nevada
Nevada Wolf Pack football seasons
Nevada Sagebrushers football